Pulkkinen was a Finnish sketch series which broadcast between 1999 and 2002, starring actors  and . The series was written by Juha Jokela and is known for its courageous humor. Pulkkinen's first season was released on DVD in 2005 and the second season in 2006. The third and last series was published in October 2006.

References

External links
 

Finnish television sketch shows
1999 Finnish television series debuts
2002 Finnish television series endings
1990s Finnish television series
2000s Finnish television series
Nelonen original programming
Jim (TV channel) original programming

fi:Pulkkinen